Moycarkey is a hamlet in North Tipperary, Ireland.

Moycarkey or Moycarky may also refer to::
Moycarky, a civil parish in North Tipperary, Ireland
Moycarky (townland)
Moycarkey Castle, a castle in the above townland
Moycarkey (electoral division), originally an electoral district in the Thurles poor law union but still used for various administrative purposes
Moycarkey, Littleton, Two-Mile-Borris, a Catholic parish in North Tipperary, Ireland